LBHS may refer to:

Laguna Beach High School, Laguna Beach, California, USA
Lake Brantley High School, Altamonte Springs, Florida, USA
Lemon Bay High School, Englewood, Florida, USA
Long Bay High School, Providenciales, Turks and Caicos (UK)
Lord Beaverbrook High School, Calgary, Alberta, Canada
Lord Botetourt High School, Daleville, Virginia, USA
Long Beach High School, multiple schools
Long Branch High School, Long Branch, New Jersey
Lucy Beckham High School, Mt Pleasant, South Carolina
the ICAO airport code for Haskovo Malevo Airport in Bulgaria
Les Beaucamps High School, Castel, Guernsey Lancaster Baptist High School, Lancaster, California